Psychocandy is the debut studio album by Scottish rock band the Jesus and Mary Chain. It was released in November 1985 on Blanco y Negro Records. The album is considered a landmark recording: its combination of guitar feedback and noise with traditional pop melody and structure proved influential on the forthcoming shoegazing genre and alternative rock in general.

The album reached No. 31 on the UK Albums Chart and was preceded by three charting 1985 singles: "Never Understand", "You Trip Me Up", and "Just Like Honey". The band moved away from its abrasive sound with their follow-up album, 1987's Darklands.

Background and recording
After quitting their jobs in 1980, brothers Jim and William Reid formed The Jesus and Mary Chain with bass player Douglas Hart. Taking inspiration from German industrial band Einstürzende Neubauten, girl group the Shangri-Las and The Velvet Underground & Nico, they bought a Portastudio in 1983 when their father lost his job in a local factory and gave the brothers £300 from his redundancy money. The band recorded a demo tape containing the songs "Upside Down" and "Never Understand" which was heard by Glaswegian musician Bobby Gillespie, who in turn passed it on to his friend Alan McGee of Creation Records. McGee was impressed with the tape and invited the band to play at a Creation Records showcase event in London, becoming the band's manager shortly afterwards.

Following more London concerts, the Jesus and Mary Chain entered Alaska Studios in Waterloo, South London and recorded their debut single, "Upside Down". Released by Creation Records in November 1984 and featuring a B-side produced by Slaughter Joe, "Upside Down" sold out its initial pressing and ended the year by being placed at number 37 in John Peel's Festive Fifty. After recruiting Gillespie as their drummer in late 1984, the Jesus and Mary Chain signed to the WEA subsidiary label Blanco y Negro, which had been established by Rough Trade founder Geoff Travis. The band entered Island Studios to record with engineer Stephen Street but the sessions proved to be fruitless and the band returned to Alaska Studios for the recording of their second single, "Never Understand". The single was released by Blanco y Negro in February 1985, and in March that year they began recording their debut album with engineer John Loder at Southern Studios in Wood Green, North London. Psychocandy was recorded in six weeks and totalled £17,000 in recording and production costs.

Music and lyrics
Psychocandy contains fourteen tracks with a total running time of thirty-nine minutes. The music has been described as "bubblegum pop drowned in feedback", that fused "melody with obnoxious bursts of white noise." Critics have noted the influence of classic '60s pop groups such as the Beach Boys and the Rolling Stones alongside the work of rock bands the Velvet Underground, the Stooges and Suicide on the album.

Lead vocals are handled by Jim Reid on this album, with the exception of "It's So Hard", sung by William Reid.

Release
The album includes the singles "Never Understand", "You Trip Me Up" and "Just Like Honey". Following reissue on CD in August 1986, the bonus track "Some Candy Talking", which was originally released on the namesake EP, was included on the album, only on the UK Blanco y Negro CDs released in 1986 and 1997; in the US, it was released on CD by Reprise in 1986 and American Recordings in 1993 without the bonus track. In 2006, the album was remastered and released in DualDisc format without "Some Candy Talking" to conform with the original playlist. In 2011, it was re-released (along with the other five studio albums) by Edsel in collaboration with Rhino as a two-CD set with extra tracks (singles, B-sides, demos and Peel Sessions) and a DVD (NTSC, all-region).

Reception and legacy

On release Psychocandy received favourable reviews. Writing for NME, Andy Gill described the album as "a great searing citadel of beauty whose wall of noise, once scaled, offers access to endless vistas of melody and emotion", while William Shaw of Smash Hits called it "a wonderful LP which should bring the Scottish brats the success they've missed out on so far". Tim Holmes of Rolling Stone praised the band as "a perfect recombinant of every Edge City outlaw ethic ever espoused in rock." In the end of year-roundups, the album placed at number two in NME's list of best albums of 1985,  number 3 in The Face, and number 5 in Melody Maker.

Subsequently, the album has frequently appeared in "best ever" album lists, such as Q magazine's "100 Greatest British Albums Ever", where it placed at number 88 in 2000. In 2006, Q magazine placed the album at number 23 in its "40 Best Albums of the '80s" list. In 2003, the album was ranked number 268 on Rolling Stone magazine's "The 500 Greatest Albums of All Time" list, and 269 in a 2012 revised list.  The magazine also ranked the album number 45 on its list of the 100 Best Debut Albums of All Time. AllMusic described the album as one that "created a movement without meaning to."

In 2002 Pitchfork listed Psychocandy as the 23rd best album of the 1980s. In their 2018 update of the list, the album was listed at number 40. Slant Magazine listed the album at number 38 in its "Best Albums of the 1980s" list, saying, "Shaping fuzz into a potent, tactile instrument, The Jesus and Mary Chain helped establish the style of distortion-laden fogginess that would eventually become the foundation for shoegaze."  The album was also included in the book 1001 Albums You Must Hear Before You Die. PopMatters included Psychocandy in their list of the "12 Essential 1980s Alternative Rock Albums" saying, "it may still be the only noise pop LP anyone ever really needs to own".

Track listing

Note: the 1986 CD release contains the extra track "Some Candy Talking", between "Taste of Cindy" and "Never Understand".

Personnel
All personnel credits adapted from Psychocandys liner notes.

The Jesus and Mary Chain
Jim Reid – vocals, guitar 
William Reid – vocals, guitar
Douglas Hart – bass
Bobby Gillespie – drums

Additional musicians
Karen Parker – backing vocals 
Laurence Verfaillie – backing vocals 

Technical
The Jesus and Mary Chain – production
John Loder – engineering
Flood – engineer 
Alan Moulder – assistant engineer 

Design
Greg Allen – art direction
Alastair Indge – sleeve photography
Bleddyn Butcher – sleeve photography
Chris Clown – sleeve photography
Mike Laye – sleeve photography
Rona McIntosh – sleeve photography
Stuart Cassidy – sleeve photography

Charts

Certifications

References

External links
 

Psychocandy (Adobe Flash) at Radio3Net (streamed copy where licensed)

The Jesus and Mary Chain albums
1985 debut albums
Blanco y Negro Records albums
Noise pop albums